Richard Travis  (born William Benton Justice, April 17, 1913 – July 11, 1989) was an American actor in films and television.

Early years
The son of William Justice and Ella Justice, née Spain, he was born in Carlsbad, New Mexico and grew up in Paragould, Arkansas. His father owned and operated a marble yard in Paragould. He was a radio announcer and a sportscaster before he became an actor.

Film
Travis began his Hollywood career in 1930s action films. The high point of his career was a supporting role in the 1942 film comedy The Man Who Came to Dinner (1942), playing opposite Bette Davis.  He had some other fairly important roles in the early 1940s, but his career soon declined.  He spent World War II with the Army Air Forces's Broadway show Winged Victory.

In 1947, he starred in the B movie Backlash, which has become something of a cult classic among film noir fans, as well as Jewels of Brandenburg, a crime drama.

Television
Travis was busy in television roles in the early 1950s. He had the lead role of assistant Sheriff Rodger Barnett in the syndicated crime drama Code 3, which aired for 39 episodes in 1957.

Real estate
Travis retired from acting to pursue a  career in California real estate under his birth name. He founded the William Justice Company and became an officer on the Beverly Hills Realty Board.

Military service
Travis served in the United States Army Air Forces.

Partial filmography

References

External links
 

American male film actors
1913 births
1989 deaths
20th-century American male actors